Charles Dourcy Holliday (January 26, 1914 – August 22, 1992), nicknamed "Flit", was an American Negro league outfielder in the 1930s.

A native of Beaumont, Texas, Holliday played for the Atlanta Black Crackers in 1938. In 11 recorded games, he posted four hits in 31 plate appearances. Holliday died in Edwardsville, Illinois in 1992 at age 78.

References

External links
 and Seamheads

1914 births
1992 deaths
Atlanta Black Crackers players
Baseball outfielders
Baseball players from Texas
Sportspeople from Beaumont, Texas
20th-century African-American sportspeople